Campeloma is a genus of gilled operculate  freshwater snails in the family Viviparidae.

Distribution
They are common in unpolluted rivers in the eastern United States and southeastern Canada.

Species
Species within the genus Campeloma include:
  † Campeloma acroterion J. H. Hartman, 2015
 Campeloma brevispirum F. C. Baker, 1928
 Campeloma crassula Rafinesque, 1819 - ponderous campeloma
 Campeloma decampi (W. G. Binney, 1865) - the slender campeloma
 Campeloma decisum (Say, 1817) - pointed campeloma
 Campeloma exile (Anthony, 1860)
 Campeloma floridense Call, 1886 - purple-throat campeloma
 Campeloma geniculum (Conrad, 1834) - ovate campeloma
 Campeloma gibbum (Currier, 1867)
 Campeloma leptum Mattox, 1940
 Campeloma lewisi Walker, 1915
 Campeloma limum (Anthony, 1860) - file campeloma
 Campeloma milesi (I. Lea, 1863)
 Campeloma nebrascensis (Meek & Hayden, 1856)
 Campeloma parthenum Vail, 1979 - maiden campeloma
 Campeloma regulare (I. Lea, 1841) - cylinder campeloma
 Campeloma rufum (Haldeman, 1841)
 Campeloma subsolidum Anthony -  anatomy
 Campeloma tannum Mattox, 1940

References 

Viviparidae
Taxa named by Constantine Samuel Rafinesque
Taxonomy articles created by Polbot